Marie Modiano (born 1 September 1978) is a French singer and writer.

Biography 
Marie Modiano was born on 1 September 1978 in Paris and is the second daughter of Dominique Zehrfuss and literature Nobel Prize winner Patrick Modiano and the sister of film director Zina Modiano. She was raised in Paris and studied acting at the Royal Academy of Dramatic Art in London. After studying acting – with a supporting role in the French film La Vie privée (2007) directed by her sister and the role of Ismène in the play Phèdre directed by Luc Bondy (she acted in the play during a tour in Europe, United States and Japan) —, she is now a lyricist, composer and singer. Her first album I'm Not a Rose, created by composer Grégoire Hetzel was released in 2006 by Naïve. Outland, her second album was issued in 2008. In 2012 Éditions Gallimard published her book of poetry entitled Espérance mathématique. In spring 2013, Marie Modiano announced the release of two albums, Ram on a Flag and Espérance Mathématique – the second album being her poetry set to music by her life partner Peter von Poehl – as well as her first novel Upsilon Scorpii.

Albums 
 2006: I'm Not a Rose
 2008: Outland
 2013: Ram on a Flag
 2013: Espérance mathématique
 2018: Pauvre chanson 
 2021: Songs from the Other Side (with Peter von Poehl)

Literary works 
 2012: 28 paradis, 28 enfers in collaboration with Patrick Modiano and Dominique Zerfhuss (texts and drawings)
 2012: Espérance mathématique (poetry) 
 2013: Upsilon Scorpii (novel)

References

External links 
  of Marie Modiano

1978 births
Living people
French people of Belgian descent
French people of Italian-Jewish descent
21st-century French singers
Singers from Paris
21st-century French non-fiction writers
21st-century French women writers
Writers from Paris
21st-century French women singers